Ebenezer Jolls Ormsbee (June 8, 1834 – April 3, 1924), the 41st governor of Vermont, was a Republican Party politician, a teacher, a lawyer and an American Civil War veteran.

Early life
Ormsbee was born in Shoreham, Vermont, the son of John Mason and Polly (Willson) Ormsbee. After combining farm work and an early education at academies at Brandon and South Woodstock, he began studying law in 1857, and was admitted to the Rutland County bar in 1861.

Civil War
He enlisted in the Brandon "Allen Grays" in April 1861, which became Company G of the 1st Vermont Infantry. He was elected 2nd lieutenant on April 25, 1861, and served with the regiment for its full three-month term.  In September 1862, he joined Company G, 12th Vermont Infantry, serving as its captain, and was mustered out with his regiment in July 1863.

Post war life
After he returned home, Ormsbee started practicing law in Brandon, as a partner of Anson A. Nicholson, and later with Ebenezer N. Briggs.

He was appointed assistant United States internal revenue assessor in 1868, serving until 1872. He served as state's attorney for Rutland County from 1870 to 1874, represented Brandon in the Vermont House of Representatives from 1872 to 1873, and Rutland County in the Vermont State Senate from 1878 to 1879. He served a trustee of the Vermont Reform School from 1880 to 1884.

In 1884, Ormsbee was nominated by the State Republican Convention to run for lieutenant governor; Ormsbee received 297 of the 510 votes, winning the nomination and the subsequent general election. He was elected governor in 1886. During his administration, he appointed a commission of three members to revise the educational laws of the state, and presided over the initial work of the state's new railroad commission.

In 1887, President Grover Cleveland proposed to return Confederate flags captured by Union troops during the Civil War. This obviously caused a storm of opposition throughout the north.  The Vermont Department of the Grand Army of the Republic declared "we most solemnly and earnestly protest for ourselves and in the name of our fallen comrades,... against removing from their final resting place the bloody emblems of a treason that cost many precious lives, fully believing that such removal will do more to keep alive the bitter recollections of the war than anything that has transpired since its close." Governor Ormsbee forwarded this resolution to President Cleveland, declaring they "have my unqualified and warmest approval, and you may rest assured that they contain the sentiments of Vermont on this subject."

At the end of 1891 Ormsbee was appointed by President Benjamin Harrison to serve on a commission to treat with the Paiute Indians at the Pyramid Lake Indian Reservation, in Nevada, to get the tribe to relinquish a claim to part of their reservation.

The same year, he was appointed by President Harrison U.S. Land commissioner at Samoa to act with similar British and German commissions to adjust claims of foreigners to lands in Samoa, representing millions of acres of land. Ormsbee completed his work in May 1893, returned to the United States and resumed his law practice in Brandon.

In 1896, ex-Governor Ormsbee joined a number of Vermont luminaries in a train trip to Canton, Ohio, in support of William McKinley's campaign for the presidency. In 1901, he presided over a banquet in honor of Vice President Theodore Roosevelt. In 1902, now President, Roosevelt returned to Vermont, and Ormsbee again presided over the ceremonies at a train stop in Brandon.

In 1913, ex-Governor Ormsbee presided over the dedication of a monument to Stephen A. Douglas, Brandon's most famous native son.

Orsmbee married, in 1862, Jennie L. Briggs, daughter of Ebenezer N. Briggs of Brandon. She died in 1866. He married again, in 1867, Frances Davenport, daughter of William L. and Loretta Cole Wadhams of Wadhams Mills, New York.

He was a Freemason, and a longtime comrade of C. J. Ormsbee Post #18, Grand Army of the Republic, named for his brother, Charles James Ormsbee, 5th Vermont Infantry, who was killed in action at the Battle of the Wilderness on May 5, 1864.

Ormsbee was president of the Brandon Free Public Library, president of the Brandon Cemetery Association, member of the prudential committee of the Brandon graded and high school for over 27 years, and president of the Brandon National Bank for more than 14 years.

He died of apoplexy in Brandon, and was interred in Pine Hill cemetery.

See also
Vermont in the Civil War

References

Sources
 Benedict, G. G., Vermont in the Civil War. A History of the part taken by the Vermont Soldiers And Sailors in the War For The Union, 1861-5, Burlington, VT: The Free Press Association, 1888, pp. i:436, ii:402.
 Crockett, Walter Hill, Vermont The Green Mountain State, New York: The Century History Company, Inc., 1921, iv:143, 160–163, 168, 216, 245, 349, 353, 362, 388, 449.
 Dodge, Prentiss C., Encyclopedia Vermont Biography, Burlington, VT: Ullery Publishing Company, 1912, pp. 47–48.
 Peck, Theodore S., compiler, Revised Roster of Vermont Volunteers and lists of Vermonters Who Served in the Army and Navy of the United States During the War of the Rebellion, 1861–66. Montpelier, VT.: Press of the Watchman Publishing Co., 1892, pp. 20, 156, 168, 469.
 Ullery, Jacob C., compiler, Men of Vermont: An Illustrated Biographical History of Vermonters and Sons of Vermont, Brattleboro, VT: Transcript Publishing Company, 1894, part ii, p. 292.

External links

Ebenezer Jolls Ormsbee at Political GraveyardEbenezer Jolls Ormsbee at National Governors Association''

1834 births
1924 deaths
Republican Party governors of Vermont
Lieutenant Governors of Vermont
Republican Party Vermont state senators
Republican Party members of the Vermont House of Representatives
People of Vermont in the American Civil War
2nd Vermont Brigade
People from Shoreham, Vermont
Vermont lawyers
State's attorneys in Vermont
Burials in Vermont
19th-century American lawyers